Nenad Adamović (born 12 January 1989) is a Serbian professional footballer who plays as a winger for Mladost Lučani.

At the age of 18, Adamović was selected to represent the European side at the 2007 UEFA-CAF Meridian Cup.

Club career
Adamović started out with his hometown club Karađorđe Topola, before joining the youth system of Partizan in 2002. He signed his first professional contract with the club in January 2007, penning a five-year deal. However, Adamović failed to make a competitive debut for Partizan, spending several seasons on loan with their affiliated side Teleoptik.

Between 2010 and 2013, Adamović played for three Serbian SuperLiga clubs, namely Metalac Gornji Milanovac, Smederevo, and Hajduk Kula. He amassed a total of 78 appearances and scored 12 goals in the top flight of Serbian football.

In July 2013, Adamović moved abroad to Belarus and signed with Dinamo Minsk on a three-year deal. He immediately established himself as a first-team regular, playing the full 90 minutes in his official debut for the club in a 2–1 away league win over Gomel. During his time at Dinamo Minsk, Adamović scored a total of 20 league goals in 80 appearances.

In the summer of 2016, Adamović signed with Israeli club Maccabi Petah Tikva. He helped the side finish fourth in the 2016–17 Israeli Premier League, scoring once from 21 appearances.

On the last day of the 2017 summer transfer window, Adamović returned to Serbia and signed with Čukarički on a one-year deal. He moved back to Belarus at the beginning of the following year and joined Vitebsk.

International career
Adamović represented Serbia and Montenegro at the 2006 UEFA Under-17 Championship. He was also capped for Serbia at under-19 level.

Notes

References

External links
 
 
 

1989 births
Living people
People from Topola
Serbia and Montenegro footballers
Serbian footballers
Association football wingers
Serbia youth international footballers
Serbian expatriate footballers
Serbian expatriate sportspeople in Belarus
Serbian expatriate sportspeople in Israel
Serbian expatriate sportspeople in Kazakhstan
Expatriate footballers in Belarus
Expatriate footballers in Israel
Expatriate footballers in Kazakhstan
Serbian First League players
Serbian SuperLiga players
Belarusian Premier League players
Israeli Premier League players
Kazakhstan Premier League players
FK Partizan players
FK Teleoptik players
FK Metalac Gornji Milanovac players
FK Smederevo players
FK Hajduk Kula players
FC Dinamo Minsk players
Maccabi Petah Tikva F.C. players
FK Čukarički players
FC Vitebsk players
FC Zhetysu players
FC Taraz players
FC Neman Grodno players
FK Mladost Lučani players